The Samford Bulldogs men's basketball team is the basketball team that represents Samford University in Homewood, Alabama, United States. The school's team currently competes in the Southern Conference. They are currently led by head coach Bucky McMillan and play their home games at the Pete Hanna Center.

Postseason

NCAA Division I Tournament results
The Bulldogs have appeared twice in the NCAA Division I tournament. Their combined record is 0–2.

CIT results
The Bulldogs have appeared in one CollegeInsider.com Postseason Tournament (CIT). Their record is 1–1.

References

External links